The Women's Pan American Challenge is a quadrennial international women's field hockey competition in the Americas organized by the Pan American Hockey Federation. The tournament serves as the qualification tournament for the next Women's Pan American Cup.

The tournament was created in 2011 when the PAHF created a tiered system with the Pan American Challenge as the second tier below the Pan American Cup. The first edition was held in Rio de Janeiro, Brazil.

Results

Summary

* = hosts

Team appearances

See also
Men's Pan American Challenge
Women's Pan American Cup

References

External links
Pan American Hockey Federation

 
Pan American Challenge
Pan American Challenge